Alexander de Moubray was the member of Parliament for Coventry in 1306. He was a city justice.

References 

Members of the Parliament of England for Coventry
English MPs 1306
Year of birth unknown
Year of death unknown